The Congressional Space Medal of Honor was authorized by the United States Congress in 1969 to recognize "any astronaut who in the performance of his or her duties has distinguished himself or herself by exceptionally meritorious efforts and contributions to the welfare of the Nation and mankind." It's awarded by the President of the United States in Congress's name on recommendations from the Administrator of the National Aeronautics and Space Administration. The award is a separate decoration from the Medal of Honor, which is a military award for extreme bravery and gallantry in combat.

Albeit the Congressional Space Medal of Honor is a civilian award of the United States government, it is authorized as a non-military decoration for display on U.S. military uniforms because it is awarded by a federal agency.  In such cases, the Congressional Space Medal of Honor is worn as a ribbon "immediately preceding the Prisoner of War Medal.". DoD policy specifically prohibits wear of any non-military awards for valor or service, but the Congressional Space Medal of Honor only recognizes meritorious achievement, so it does not fall under this prohibition.

To be awarded the Congressional Space Medal of Honor, an astronaut must perform feats of extraordinary accomplishment while participating in space flight under the authority of NASA.  Typically, the Congressional Space Medal of Honor is awarded for scientific discoveries or actions of tremendous benefit to mankind. The decoration may also be awarded for extreme bravery during a space emergency or in preventing a major space disaster, or posthumously to those astronauts who die while performing a US space mission. , all 17 astronauts killed on US missions had been awarded the medal.

President George W. Bush awarded the most CSMOH, 16 (14 of them posthumous for the two destroyed space shuttle flights). The 16-year hiatus from April 2006 to January 2023 is the longest gap between awards.

U.S. President Jimmy Carter – 6 presentations

U.S. President Ronald Reagan – 1 presentation

U.S. President George H. W. Bush – 1 presentation

U.S. President Bill Clinton – 4 presentations

U.S. President George W. Bush – 16 presentations

U.S. President Joe Biden - 2 presentations

Recipients
The medal has been awarded to 28 astronauts, of which 17 were made posthumously for those who died preparing for or during an American spaceflight.  Of those 17, three died in the Apollo 1 fire, seven died in the Space Shuttle Challenger disaster, and seven in the Space Shuttle Columbia disaster.  Four of the twelve moonwalkers received the medal (Armstrong, Conrad, Shepard, and Young), but only Neil Armstrong for his lunar mission.  The New Nine class of U.S. astronauts (the second group of astronauts selected by NASA) has the most recipients of the medal, with seven.  Second is NASA Astronaut Group 8 which received five awards, four for astronauts killed in the Challenger Disaster ( is the only Group 8 astronaut to receive the award who was not killed in the Challenger Disaster).

Eight recipients are living, four over 80 years old.  Frank Borman is the last remaining of the first six recipients of the CSMOH in 1978.

In the table below, an asterisk indicates a posthumous award.

See also 
 Awards and decorations of the United States government

References

Awards and decorations of NASA
Awards established in 1969